Whiteodendron is a genus of plant in family Myrtaceae described as a genus in 1952. It contains only one known species, Whiteodendron moultonianum, endemic to Borneo.

References

Monotypic Myrtaceae genera
Endemic flora of Borneo